Syneilesis is a genus of East Asian plants in the groundsel tribe within the Asteraceae.

Species include:
 Syneilesis aconitifolia (Bunge) Maxim. - Amur, Primorye, Khabarovsk, Anhui, Fujian, Gansu, Guizhou, Hebei, Heilongjiang, Henan, Jiangsu, Liaoning, Shaanxi, Shanxi, Zhejiang, Japan, Korea
 Syneilesis australis Ling - Anhui, Zhejiang
 Syneilesis intermedia (Hayata) Kitam. - Taiwan
 Syneilesis palmata (Thunb.) Maxim. - Japan, Korea
 Syneilesis subglabrata (Yamam. & Sasaki) Kitam. - Taiwan
 Syneilesis tagawae (Kitam.) Kitam. - Shikoku

References

Senecioneae
Asteraceae genera
Flora of the Russian Far East
Flora of China
Flora of Eastern Asia